This article is a list of winners of Troféu HQ Mix, sorted by category.

People

Best caricaturist
1997: Chico Caruso
1998: Osvaldo
1999: Cau Gomez
2000: Dalcio
2001: Loredano
2002: Baptistão
2003: Loredano
2004: Quinho
2005: Baptistão
2006: Baptistão
2007: Baptistão
2008: Baptistão
2009: Dalcio
2010: Fernandes
2011: Gustavo Duarte
2012: Gustavo Duarte

Best cartoonist
1997: Lage
1998: Santiago
1999: Santiago
2000: Santiago
2001: Spacca
2002: Laerte Coutinho
2003: Gilmar
2004: Laerte Coutinho
2005: Laerte Coutinho
2006: Spacca
2007: Laerte Coutinho
2008: Alan Sieber
2009: Duke
2010: Airon
2011: Alan Sieber
2012: Dálcio Machado

Best children's book illustrator
2004: Mariana Massarani
2005: Cárcamo
2006: Cárcamo
2007: Daniel Bueno
2008: Daniel Bueno

Best colorist
1999: Alexandre Jubran
2000: Alexandre Jubran
2001: Lílian Maruyama
2002: André Vazzios
2003: Alexandre Jubran
2016: Cris Peter, for Casanova – Volume 3 – Avaritia, Pétalas and Projeto Manhattan – Volume 1
2017: Cris Peter, for Astronauta – Assimetria and Memórias do Mauricio
2018: Cris Peter
2019: Mariane Gusmão, for Desafiadores do Destino
2020: Wagner Willian, for Silvestre

Best columnist
Until 2007, this category was called "Best Specialized Journalist".
1989: Álvaro de Moya
1990: André Forastieri
2001: Sidney Gusman
2002: Sidney Gusman
2003: Sidney Gusman
2004: Sidney Gusman
2005: Sidney Gusman
2006: Sidney Gusman
2007: Sidney Gusman
2008: Paulo Ramos
2009: Rogério de Campos
2010: Sérgio Codespoti

Best editor
1989: Jal and Gualberto Costa
1990: Rogério de Campos

Best editorial cartoonist
1997: Angeli
1998: Angeli
1999: Angeli
2000: Angeli
2001: Angeli
2002: Angeli
2003: Angeli
2004: Angeli
2005: Angeli
2006: Angeli
2007: Angeli
2008: Angeli
2009: Angeli
2010: Angeli
2011: Angeli
2012: Angeli

Best foreign penciller
The award considers the Brazilian edition of their works.
1989: Frank Miller 
1990: Dave Stevens 
1991: Kent Williams 
1992: Katsuhiro Otomo 
1993: Todd McFarlane 
1994: John Romita Jr. 
1995: Ivo Milazzo 
1996: George Pratt 
1997: Frank Miller 
1998: Alex Ross 
1999: Will Eisner 
2000: Jeff Smith , for Bone
2001: Ivo Milazzo , for Ken Parker
2002: Ivo Milazzo , for Ken Parker
2003: Takehiko Inoue , for Vagabond
2004: Lorenzo Mattotti , for Estigmas (Stigmates)
2005: Will Eisner , for Avenida Dropsie (Dropsie Avenue)
2006: Milo Manara , for Bórgia (I Borgia)
2007: Milo Manara , for El Gaucho, Bórgia – poder e incesto (I Borgia) and O Clic (Il gioco)
2008: John Cassaday , for Planetary
2009: Liniers , for Macanudo
2010: Craig Thompson , for Retalhos (Blankets)
2012: David Mazzucchelli , for Asterios Polyp
2013: Craig Thompson , for Habibi
2014: Enki Bilal , for Tetralogia Monstro (La Tétralogie du Monstre)
2015: Andrew C. Robinson , for O Quinto Beatle (The Fifth Beatle)

Best foreign writer
The award considers the Brazilian edition of their works.
1989: Alan Moore 
1990: Neil Gaiman 
1991: Alan Moore 
1992: Neil Gaiman 
1993: Neil Gaiman 
1994: Neil Gaiman 
1995: Neil Gaiman 
1996: Art Spiegelman 
1997: Frank Miller 
1998: Garth Ennis 
1999: Frank Miller 
2000: David Lapham , for Balas Perdidas (Stray Bullets)
2001: Alan Moore , for Do Inferno (From Hell)
2002: Giancarlo Berardi , for Ken Parker
2003: Alan Moore , for Tom Strong and Top Ten
2004: Alan Moore , for A Liga Extraordinária (The League of Extraordinary Gentlemen)
2005: Will Eisner , for Avenida Dropsie (Dropsie Avenue)
2006: Osamu Tezuka , for Buda (Budda)
2007: Kazuo Koike , for Lobo Solitário (Kozure Ōkami)
2008: Alan Moore , for Lost Girls
2009: Alan Moore , for Promethea
2010: Chris Ware , for Jimmy Corrigan
2011: Joe Sacco , for Notas sobre Gaza (Footnotes in Gaza)
2012: David Mazzucchelli , for Asterios Polyp
2013: Robert Kirkman , for The Walking Dead
2014: Robert Kirkman , for The Walking Dead
2015: Mark Waid , for Demolidor (Daredevil)

Best graphic humor artist
2013: Angeli
2014: Alpino
2015: Dálcio Machado

Best illustrator
1997: Kipper
1998: Negreiros
1999: Patrícia Bisso
2000: Garutti
2001: Mariza
2002: Orlando
2003: Renato Guedes
2004: Samuel Casal
2005: Samuel Casal
2006: Orlando
2007: Orlando Pedroso
2008: Kako
2009: Weberson Santiago
2010: Samuel Casal

Best inker
2017: Omar Viñole, for Cadernos de Viagem, Yeshuah Absoluto and Zé do Caixão
2018: Lu Cafaggi and Vitor Cafaggi
2019: Wagner Willian, for O Martírio de Joana Dark Side
2020: Shiko, for Três Buracos

Best letterer
1999: Lilian Mitsunaga

Best new talent (penciller)
Until 2010, this category was called "Revelation Penciller".
1990: Osvaldo Pavanelli
1991: Jaca
1992: Kipper
1993: MZK
1994: Guazzelli
1995: Luciano Queiroz
1996: Dalcio
1997: Lelis
1998: Alan Sieber
1999: Luciano Lagares
2000: Fábio Moon and Gabriel Bá, for 10 Pãezinhos
2001: Fábio Yabu, for Combo Rangers
2002: Samuel Casal
2003: André Kitagawa, for Front
2004: André Bueno, for Front
2005: Rafael Sica
2006: Julia Bax, for Kaos and Quebra-Queixo
2007: Fábio Lyra, for Mosh!
2008: Jozz, for Zine Royale
2009: Hemeterio, for Chibata! – João Cândido e a revolta que abalou o Brasil
2010: Gustavo Duarte, for Có!
2011: Felipe Massafera, for Jambocks
2012: Magno Costa and Marcelo Costa, for Oeste Vermelho and Matinê
2013: Pedro Franz, for Suburbia
2014: Lu Cafaggi, for Turma da Mônica - Laços
2015: Felipe Nunes, for Klaus
2016: Camila Torrano, for Fábulas and Spam
2017: Mika Takahashi, for Além dos Trilhos
2018: Bruno Seelig
2019: Melissa Garabeli, for Saudade
2020: Brendda Maria, for Cais do Porto

Best new talent (writer)
Until 2010, this category was called "Revelation Writer".
2007: Daniel Esteves, for Front nº 17
2008: Cadu Simões, for Homem-Grilo, Nova Hélade and Garagem Hermética
2009: Olintho Gadelha, for Chibata! – João Cândido e a revolta que abalou o Brasil
2010: Alex Mir, for Orixás, Subversos and Tempestade cerebral
2011: Daniel Galera, for Cachalote
2012: Vitor Cafaggi, for Valente para sempre and Duo.tone
2013: Raphael Fernandes, for Ida e Volta and Ditadura no Ar nº 2
2014: Pedro Cobiaco, for Hermatã
2015: Bianca Pinheiro, for Dora and Bear
2016: Zé Wellington, for Steampunk Ladies – Vingança a Vapor
2017: Wagner Willian, for Bulldogma
2018: Carol Pimentel
2019: Jéssica Groke, for Me Leve Quando Sair
2020: Jefferson Costa, for Roseira, Medalha e Engenho

Best penciller
1989: Alain Voss
1990: Luís Gustavo
1991: Laerte Coutinho
1992: Luiz Gê
1993: Octavio Cariello
1994: Lourenço Mutarelli
1995: Flavio Colin
1996: Angeli
1997: Mike Deodato
1998: Lelis
1999: Edgar Vasques
2000: Lourenço Mutarelli, for O dobro de cinco
2001: Lourenço Mutarelli, for O rei do ponto
2002: Lourenço Mutarelli, for A soma de tudo
2003: Laerte Coutinho, for Deus 2 and Classificados 2
2004: Samuel Casal, for Front
2005: Fábio Moon and Gabriel Bá, for 10 Pãezinhos – crítica
2006: Spacca, for Santô e os pais da aviação
2007: Fábio Moon and Gabriel Bá, for Mesa para dois
2008: Spacca, for D. João Carioca
2009: Rafael Grampá, for Mesmo Delivery
2010: Marcelo Quintanilha, for Sábado dos meus amores
2011: Danilo Beyruth, for Bando de dois
2012: Marcelo Lélis, for Saino a percurá – atra vez
2013: Danilo Beyruth, for Astronauta - Magnetar
2014: Shiko, for Piteco - Ingá and O Azul Indiferente do Céu
2015: Laudo Ferreira Jr., for Yeshuah – Volume 3 – Onde Tudo Está
2016: Rogério Coelho, for Louco – Fuga and O Barco dos Sonhos
2017: Guilherme Petreca, for Ye
2018: Marcelo D'Salete
2019: Marcelo Lélis, for Anuí
2020: Jefferson Costa, for Roseira, Medalha e Engenho

Best writer
1989: Laerte Coutinho
1990: Laerte Coutinho
1991: Laerte Coutinho
1992: Guilherme de Almeida Prado
1993: André Toral
1994: Patati
1995: Ota
1996: Newton Foot
1997: Laerte Coutinho
1998: Paulo Garfunkel
1999: Lourenço Mutarelli
2000: André Toral
2001: André Toral
2002: Wellington Srbek
2003: Lourenço Mutarelli
2004: André Diniz
2005: Lourenço Mutarelli
2006: Spacca, for Santô e os pais da aviação
2007: Lourenço Mutarelli, for Caixa de areia
2008: Wander Antunes, for O corno que sabia demais and A boa sorte de Solano Dominguez
2009: Adriana Brunstein and Samuel Casal, for Prontuário 666
2010: André Diniz, for 7 vidas, A revolta de Canudos and Ato 5
2011: Danilo Beyruth, for Bando de dois
2012: André Diniz, for Morro da Favela
2013: Gustavo Duarte, for Monstros!
2014: Vitor Cafaggi and Lu Cafaggi, for Turma da Mônica - Laços
2015: Marcello Quintanilha, for Tungstênio
2016: Lillo Parra, for Descobrindo um Novo Mundo and La Dansarina
2017: Laudo Ferreira, for Cadernos de Viagem, Yeshuah Absoluto and Zé do Caixão
2018: Marcelo D'Salete
2019: Laudo Ferreira Jr., for O Santo Sangue
2020: Daniel Esteves, for Sobre o Tempo em Que Estive Morta and Último Assalto / Fefê Torquato, for Tina: Respeito

Works

Best adaptation from tv to comics
1989: Juba & Lula, by Regis Rocha Moreira and Hector Gómez Alisio (Nova Fronteira)
1990: Juba & Lula – uma aventura na Amazônia, by Regis Rocha Moreira and Hector Gómez Alisio (Nova Fronteira)

Best adventure album
1995: Ken Parker – os cervos & um hálito de gelo (Cuccioli / Un alito di ghiaccio), by Giancarlo Berardi and Ivo Milazzo (Ensaio)
1999: Caatinga, by Hermann Huppen (Globo)
2000: Adeus, chamigo brasileiro – uma história da Guerra do Paraguai, by André Toral (Companhia das Letras)
2001: Ken Parker – um príncipe para Norma (Un principe per Norma), by Giancarlo Berardi, Ivo Milazzo and Giorgio Trevisan (CLUQ)
2002: A soma de tudo, by Lourenço Mutarelli (Devir)
2003: A soma de tudo – parte II, by Lourenço Mutarelli (Devir)
2004: Quebra-Queixo – technorama, by Marcelo Campos and many pencillers (Devir)
2005: A Liga Extraordinária – volume II (The League of Extraordinary Gentlemen, Volume II), by Alan Moore and Kevin O'Neill (Devir)
2006: As aventuras de Tintim – os charutos do faraó (Les Cigares du Pharaon), by Hergé (Cia. das Letras)
2007: 100 Balas – blues para um minuteman (100 Bullets – The Hard Way), by Brian Azzarello and Eduardo Risso (Opera Graphica)
2008: Os 300 de Esparta (300), by Frank Miller (Devir)

Best adventure comic book
1998: The Savage Dragon, by Erik Larsen (Abril Jovem)
2004: 100 Balas (100 Bullets), by Brian Azzarello and Eduardo Risso (Opera Graphica)
2005: Marvel Max, by may authors (Panini)
2006: Lobo Solitário (Kozure Ōkami), by Kazuo Koike and Goseki Kojima (Panini)
2007: Lobo Solitário (Kozure Ōkami), by Kazuo Koike and Goseki Kojima (Panini)
2008: Lobo Solitário (Kozure Ōkami), by Kazuo Koike and Goseki Kojima (Panini)

Best adventure and fiction comic book
1989: Aventura e Ficção, by many authors (Abril)
1990: Aventura e Ficção, by many authors (Abril)
1994: Pau Brasil, by many authors (Vidente)
1996: Tex – Edição Especial Colorida (Tex #400), by Claudio Nizzi and Aurelio Galleppini (Globo)
1999: Gen 13 & WildC.A.T.S., by many authors (Abril Jovem)
2000: Quebra-Queixo, by Marcelo Campos (Brainstore)
2001: Mirabilia, by Wellington Srbek, Júlio Shimamoto, Flavio Colin and Klévisson Viana (Tupynanquim)
2002: 100 Balas (100 Bullets), by Brian Azzarello and Eduardo Risso (Opera Graphica)
2003: Vagabond, by Takehiko Inoue (Conrad)

Best adventure/horror/fantasy publication
This category was merged from "Best Adventure Album", "Best Adventure Comic Book", "Best Adventure and Fiction Comic Book", "Best Fiction Album", "Best Fiction, Adventure and Horror Album", "Best Horror Album", "Best Horror Comic Book" and "Best Horror Publication"; and, until 2015, this category was called "Best Adventure/Horror/Fiction Publication".
2009: 100 Balas (100 Bullets), by Brian Azzarello and Eduardo Risso (Pixel)
2010: J. Kendall – aventuras de uma criminóloga (Julia – Le avventure di una criminologa), by Giancarlo Berardi and many pencillers
2011: Vertigo, by many authors (Panini)
2012: Birds, by Gustavo Duarte (independent)
2013: The Walking Dead, by Robert Kirkman and Tony Moore (HQM)
2014: Piteco - Ingá, by Shiko (Panini)
2015: Astronauta – Singularidade, by Danilo Beyruth (Panini)
2016: Lavagem, by Shiko (Panini)
2017: Astronauta – Assimetria, by Danilo Beyruth (Panini)
2018: Meu Amigo Dahmer (My Friend Dahmer), by Derf Backderf (Darkside)
2019: Samurai Shirô, by Danilo Beyruth (DarkSide)
2020: Gibi de Menininha 2, by many authors (Zarabatana)

Best caricatures publication
Until 2003, this category was called "Best Caricatures Book".
1998: Quem é Sábat?, by Sábat
1999: Fatores de risco – coletânea de charges e caricaturas, by Erthal (Paz e Terra)
2000: Sem perder a linha, by Fausto (Ediouro)
2002: O poder sem pudor, by Cláudio Humberto and Osvaldo Pavanelli (Diário Popular)
2003: Alfabeto literário, by Loredano (Geração)
2008: É mentira, Chico?, by Ziraldo (Capivara)
2010: 50 razões para rir, by Toni D'Agostinho (Noovha América)
2011: Bravo! Literatura & Futebol, by Ricardo Soares (Abril)

Best cartoons publication
Until 2003, this category was called "Best Cartoons Book".
1994: Ninguém é de ferro, by Santiago (L&PM)
1995: Soltando as hienas, by Biratan
1996: Humor gráfico na Bahia – o traço dos mestres, by Gutemberg Cruz (Arembepe)
1997: Urubu e o Flamengo, by Henfil (34)
1998: De papo pro ar, by Santiago (L&PM)
1999: Humor em risco – cartuns, by Érico
2000: A vida por uma linha, by Samuca
2001: Paraíba e Piauí no cartum – com todo o risco, by many authors
2002: Risco de 7 cabeças – o melhor do cartum paraense, by many authors
2003: Humor pela paz e a falta que ela faz, by Mario Dimov Mastrotti, organizer (Virgo)
2004: Sexo é uma coisa suja, by Angeli (Devir)
2005: Bem, Obrigado. E Você? / Quinoterapia / Quanta Bondade!, by Quino (Martins Fontes)
2006: Sem comentários, by Allan Sieber (Casa 21)
2007: Antologia do Pasquim – vol. 1, by many authors (Desiderata)
2008: Assim rasteja a humanidade, by Allan Sieber (Desiderata)
2009: Tulípio #7, by Eduardo Rodrigues and Paulo Stocker (independent)
2010: Sem palavras, by Samuca (independent)
2011: Cócegas no raciocínio, by João Montanaro (Garimpo)

Best children's album
1989: A essência de Calvin e Haroldo (The Essential Calvin and Hobbes), by Bill Watterson (Cedibra)
1998: Lucas – coleção Fala Menino, by Luis Augusto (Bureau)
1999: A baleia Branca (Moby Dick), by Will Eisner (Cia. das Letras)
2000: A turma do Xaxado, by Antonio Cedraz (independent)
2001: Suriá e o mundo do circo, by Laerte Coutinho (Devir)
2002: A turma do Xaxado 2, by Antonio Cedraz (independent)
2003: Todo Pererê – volume 1, by Ziraldo (Salamandra)
2004: Little Lit – fábulas e contos de fadas em quadrinhos (Little Lit), by many authors (Cia. das Letras)
2005: Todo Pererê – volume 3, by Ziraldo (Salamandra)
2006: Turma do Xaxado – Pelourinho em quadrinhos, by Antonio Cedraz (independent)
2007: Turma do Xaxado – lendas e mistérios, by Antonio Cedraz (independent)

Best children's book
1997: O homem no teto (The Man in the Ceiling), by Jules Feiffer (Cia. das Letras)
1998: Castelo Rá-Tim-Bum, by Fernandes, illustrator
1999: Bamboletras, by Dilan Camargo and Guazzelli, illustrator (Projeto)
2000: Boneco maluco e outras brincadeiras, by Elias José and Guazzelli, illustrator (Projeto)
2002: Nós e os bichos, by Marcelo R. L. Oliveira and Cárcamo, illustrator (Companhia das Letrinhas)

Best children's comic book
1989: Revistinha do Ziraldo, by Ziraldo (Abril)
1990: O Menino Maluquinho, by Ziraldo (Abril)
1991: Trapalhões, by many authors (Abril)
1992: Trapalhões, by many authors (Abril)
1993: Chico Bento, by many authors (Globo)
1994: Parque da Mônica, by many authors (Globo)
1995: Mônica, by many authors (Globo)
1996: Mônica, by many authors (Globo)
1997: Sailor Moon (Bishōjo Senshi Sērā Mūn), by Naoko Takeuchi (Abril Jovem)
1998: Almanaque da Mônica, by many authors (Globo)
1999: Turma da Mônica, by many authors (Globo)
2000: Chico Bento, by many authors (Globo)
2001: Turma da Mônica, by many authors (Globo)
2002: Mico Legal, by Sergio Morettini (Escala)
2003: Turma do Xaxado 3, by Antonio Cedraz (independent)
2004: Minha Revistinha – Turma do Xaxado, by Antonio Cedraz (independent)
2005: O Menino Maluquinho, by Ziraldo (Globo)
2006: O Menino Maluquinho, by Ziraldo (Globo)
2007: O Menino Maluquinho, by Ziraldo (Globo)

Best children's publication
This category was merged from "Best Children's Album" and "Best Children's Comic Book"; and, between 2009 and 2015, this category was called "Best Child and Youth Publication".
2008: As tiras clássicas da Turma da Mônica, by many authors (Panini)
2009: Turma da Mônica Jovem, by many authors (Panini)
2010: Turma da Mônica Jovem, by many authors (Panini)
2011: Pequenos Heróis, by many authors (Devir)
2012: Turma da Mônica Jovem, by many authors (Panini)
2013: Turma da Mônica Jovem – O casamento da Mônica, by many authors (Panini)
2014: Turma da Mônica – Laços, by Vitor Cafaggi and Lu Cafaggi (Panini)
2015: Aú, o Capoeirista e o Fantasma do Farol, by Flávio Luiz (Papel A2 Texto & Arte)
2016: Chico Bento #1–8, by many authors (Panini)
2017: O Roubo do Marsupilami (Les voleurs du Marsupilami), by Franquin (SESI-SP)
2018: Combo Rangers – Somos Iguais, by Fábio Yabu and Michel Borges (JBC)
2019: Os Diários de Amora (Les Carnets de Cerise), by Aurélie Neyret and Joris Chamblain (Nemo)
2020: Como Fazer Amigos e Enfrentar Fantasmas, by Gustavo Borges and Eric Peleias (independent)

Best classic album
1989: Príncipe Valente (Prince Valiant), by Hal Foster (EBAL)
1990: Príncipe Valente (Prince Valiant), by Hal Foster (EBAL)
1991: Príncipe Valente (Prince Valiant), by Hal Foster (EBAL)
1992: Príncipe Valente (Prince Valiant), by Hal Foster (EBAL)
1993: Príncipe Valente (Prince Valiant), by Hal Foster (EBAL)
1994: A volta do Fradim, by Henfil (Geração)
1995: Graúna ataca outra vez, by Henfil (Geração)
1996: Príncipe Valente (Prince Valiant), by Hal Foster (EBAL)
1997: Batman Clássico, by Bob Kane (L&PM)
1998: Will Eisner's Spirit Magazine, by Will Eisner (Metal Pesado)
1999: V de Vingança (V for Vendetta), by Alan Moore and David Lloyd (Via Lettera)
2000: Gen – pés descalços – uma história de Hiroshima (Hadashi no Gen), by Keiji Nakazawa (Conrad)
2001: Gen – pés descalços – uma história de Hiroshima (Hadashi no Gen), by Keiji Nakazawa (Conrad)
2002: Príncipe Valente XVI – uma nova era (Prince Valiant), by Hal Foster (Opera Graphica)
2003: Fritz the Cat, by Robert Crumb (Conrad)

Best classic comic book
1989: Spirit, by Will Eisner
1990: Cripta do Terror
1991: Spirit, by Will Eisner
1995: Coleção Invictus, by many authors (Nova Sampa)
2003: Novos Deuses (New Gods), by Jack Kirby (Opera Graphica)

Best classic publication
This category was merged from "Best Classic Album" and "Best Classic Comic Book".
2004: Zap Comix, by Robert Crumb (Conrad)
2005: Todo Pererê No. 3, by Ziraldo (Salamandra)
2006: Maus, by Art Spiegelman (Cia. das Letras)
2007: Corto Maltese – a balada do mar salgado (Una ballata del mare salato), by Hugo Pratt (Pixel)
2008: Um contrato com Deus e outras histórias de cortiço (A Contract with God), by Will Eisner (Devir)
2009: Che – os últimos dias de um herói (Vida del Che), by Héctor Oesterheld, Alberto Breccia and Enrique Breccia (Conrad)
2010: Peanuts completo – 1950 a 1952 (The Complete Peanuts), by Charles Schulz (L&PM)
2011: Peanuts completo (The Complete Peanuts), by Charles Schulz (L&PM)
2012: Arzach, by Moebius (Nemo)
2013: Diomedes – a trilogia do acidente, by Lourenço Mutarelli (Quadrinhos na Cia)
2014: Fradim, 'by Henfil (Henfil – Educação e Sustentabilidade)
2015: A Saga do Monstro do Pântano – Volumes 1 a 3 (Saga of the Swamp Thing), by many authors (Panini)
2016: Zodíaco Premium, by Jayme Cortez (Opera Graphica)
2017: Sharaz-de – Contos de As Mil e Uma Noites – Volume 1 (Sharaz-de), by Sergio Toppi (Figura)
2018: Akira, by Katsuhiro Otomo (JBC)
2019: Akira 2, by Katsuhiro Otomo (JBC)
2020: Akira 6, by Katsuhiro Otomo (JBC)

Best comic strips publication
2004: Níquel Náusea – nem tudo que balança cai, by Fernando Gonsales (Devir)
2005: Níquel Náusea – vá pentear macacos, by Fernando Gonsales (Devir)
2006: Níquel Náusea – a perereca da vizinha, by Fernando Gonsales (Devir)
2007: Níquel Náusea – tédio no chiqueiro, by Fernando Gonsales (Devir)
2008: O mundo é mágico – Calvin e Haroldo (It's a Magical World), by Bill Watterson (Conrad)
2009: Níquel Náusea – em boca fechada não entra mosca, by Fernando Gonsales (Devir)
2010: Níquel Náusea – um tigre, dois tigres, três tigres, by Fernando Gonsales (Devir)
2011: Níquel Náusea – a vaca foi pro brejo, by Fernando Gonsales (Devir)
2012: Macanudo 4, by Liniers (Zarabatana)
2013: Valente para todas, by Vitor Cafaggi (independent)
2014: Valente por opção, by Vitor Cafaggi (Panini)
2015: A Vida com Logan – para ler no sofá, by Flavio Soares (Jupati Books)
2016: Will Tirando, by Will Leite (independent)
2017: Quadrinhos dos Anos 10, by André Dahmer (Quadrinhos na Cia)
2018: Linha do Trem – The Best Of, by Raphael Salimena (Draco)
2019: Will Tirando nº 2, by Will Leite (independent)
2020: Batatinha Fantasma, by Carol Borges and Filipe Remedios (independent)

Best comics adaptation
2009: Literatura Mundial em Quadrinhos #1: Dom Quixote, by Bira Dantas (Escala)
2010: Jubiabá de Jorge Amado, by Spacca (Quadrinhos na Cia)
2011: Grandes Clássicos em Graphic Novel #5: Os Sertões – a luta, by Carlos Ferreira and Rodrigo Rosa (Desiderata)
2012: Clara dos Anjos, by Wander Antunes and Marcelo Lelis (Quadrinhos na Cia) 
2013: Coleção Shakespeare em Quadrinhos No. 4 A Tempestade, by Lillo Parra and Jefferson Costa (Nemo)
2014: Dom Casmurro, by Felipe Greco and Mario Cau (Devir)
2015: Grande Sertão: Veredas, by Eloar Guazzelli and Rodrigo Rosa (Globo)
2016: Dois Irmãos, by Fábio Moon and Gabriel Bá (Quadrinhos na Cia)
2017: Sharaz-de – Contos de As Mil e Uma Noites – Volume 1 (Sharaz-de), by Sergio Toppi (Figura)
2018: Moby Dick, by Christophe Chabouté (Pipoca & Nanquim)
2019: A Revolução dos Bichos, by Odyr (Quadrinhos na Cia)
2020: Travesti, by Edmond Baudoin and Mircea Cărtărescu (Veneta)

Best editorial cartoons publication
Until 2003, this category was called "Best Editorial Cartoons Book".
1993: Fora Collor, by Chico Caruso (Globo)
1994: Separatismo – corta essa, by many authors (L&PM)
1995: Loredano caricaturas: mancha, traço, página – a forma do cotidiano, by Cássio Loredano (Topbooks)
1996: FHC – Biografia não autorizada, by Angeli (Ensaio / Circo)
1998: 100 vezes Ique no Estadão, by Ique (Salamandra)
1999: Pittadas de Maluf, by Cláudio (Boitempo)
2000: Falando sério, by Fred (UFPB)
2001: Humor do fim do século, by Clériston, Lailson, Miguel, Ronaldo and Samuca
2002: Se arrependimento matasse, by Nani (Veloc)
2003: Era uma vez FH, by Chico Caruso (Devir)
2004: OPasquim21, by many authors
2005: OPasquim21, by many authors
2006: Diabo Coxo, by Angelo Agostini (Edusp)
2007: Antologia do Pasquim – vol. 1, by many authors (Desiderata)
2008: Urubu, by Henfil (Desiderata)
2009: Catálogo do 35º Salão Internacional de Humor de Piracicaba, by many authors (Imprensa Oficial)
2010: Catálogo do Salão de Humor da Anistia, by many authors (Senado Federal)
2011: Gibi do Glauco, by Glauco Villas Boas (Folha de S.Paulo)

Best editorial project
1997: Gibizão da Turma da Mônica, by many authors (Globo)
1998: Coleção miniTonto, by many authors (Tonto)
1999: Olho Mágico, by many authors (Tonto)
2000: Comic book – o novo quadrinho americano, by many authors (Conrad)
2001: Humor Brasil – 500 anos, by many authors (Conrad)
2002: Front, by many authors (Via Lettera)
2003: Front, by many authors (Via Lettera)
2004: Sandman – noites sem fim (The Sandman: Endless Nights), by Neil Gaiman and many pencillers (Conrad)
2005: O Melhor da Disney – as obras completas de Carl Barks, by Carl Barks (Abril Jovem)
2006: Coleção "Cidades ilustradas", by many authors (Casa 21)
2007: Cidades ilustradas – cidades do ouro, by Lelis (Casa 21)
2008: Laertevisão – coisas que não esqueci, by Laerte (Conrad)
2009: Turma da Mônica Jovem, by many authors (Panini)
2010: MSP 50 – Mauricio de Sousa por 50 artistas, by many authors (Panini)
2011: Calendário Pindura 2011, by many authors (Pegasus Alado)
2012: MSP Novos 50 – Mauricio de Sousa por 50 Novos Artistas, by many authors (Panini)
2013: Graphic MSP, by many authors (Panini)
2014: Coleção Moebius, by Moebius (Nemo)
2015: Humor Paulistano – A Experiência da Circo Editorial, 1984–1995, by Toninho Mendes, organizer (SESI-SP)
2016: O Fabuloso Quadrinho Brasileiro de 2015, by Rafael Coutinho, Clarice Reichstul and Érico Assis, organizers (Veneta)
2017: A Liga Extraordinária – Dossiê Negro – Edição de Luxo Limitada (The League of Extraordinary Gentlemen: Black Dossier), by Alan Moore and Kevin O'Neill (Devir)
2018: Os Mundos de Jack Kirby – um tributo ao rei dos quadrinhos, by many authors (Guia dos Quadrinhos)
2019: A Arte de Charlie Chan Hock Chye (The Art of Charlie Chan Hock Chye), by Sonny Liew (Pipoca & Nanquim)
2020: Batman Noir Collection (Panini)

Best erotic publication
Until 2001, this category was called "Best Erotic Album".
1989: As 110 pílulas (Le 110 pillole), by Magnus (Martins Fontes)
1990: Necron, by Magnus (L&PM)
1991: Little Ego, by Giardino (Martins Fontes) / Sampa Graphic Album #2: Fetichast – províncias do desejo, by José Márcio Nicolosi (Sampa) / O Clic 2 (Il gioco 2), by Milo Manara (Martins Fontes)
1992: Druuna, by Paolo Eleuteri Serpieri
1993: Druuna, by Paolo Eleuteri Serpieri
1994: Kama Sutra, by Milo Manara (L&PM)
2001: Volúpia, by Julio Shimamoto (Opera Graphica)
2007: Valentina – Crepax 65–66, by Guido Crepax (Conrad)
2008: Lost Girls, by Alan Moore e Melinda Gebbie (Devir)
2009: Clic 3 (Il gioco vol.3), by Milo Manara (Conrad)
2010: Verão índio (Tutto ricominciò con un'estate indiana), by Hugo Pratt and Milo Manara (Conrad)
2011: Quadrinhos sacanas – o catecismo brasileiro, by Toninho Mendes, organizer (Peixe Grande)
2012: Black Kiss, by Howard Chaykin (Devir)
2016: Caravaggio – A Morte da Virgem (Caravaggio – La tavolozza e la spada), by Milo Manara (Veneta)

Best fanzine
1990: Saga, by Ale Librandi Hy, Walter Junior and Marcelo Fernandes de Carvalho, editors
1991: Nhô-Quim, by Henrique Magalhães and José Carlos Ribeiro, editors / Guia das HQs / Tindie
1992: Matrix, by Gazy Andraus, editor
1993: Panacea, by José Mauro Kazi, editor
1994: Boletim de HQ, by USP's Núcleo de Pesquisas de Histórias em Quadrinhos / Saga, by Ale Librandi Hy, Walter Junior and Marcelo Fernandes de Carvalho, editors
1995: Cachalote
1996: Glória, Glória, Aleluia!, by Allan Sieber
1997: Anime Club
1998: Heroína, by Zed and Fido Neste
1999: Slam!
2000: 10 Pãezinhos, by Fábio Moon and Gabriel Bá
2001: Enzima
2002: Manicomics, by J.J. Marreiro, editor
2003: Informal, by André Diniz and Antonio Eder, editores
2004: Xerocs Porcoration, by Samuel Casal, Galvão Bertazzi and Artur de Carvalho
2005: Manicomics, by J.J. Marreiro, editor
2006: Manicomics, by J.J. Marreiro, editor
2007: Subterrâneo

Best fiction album
1989: Major Fatal (Le Garage Hermétique), by Moebius (L&PM)
1990: A Mulher Enigma (La Femme Piège), by Enki Bilal (Martins Fontes)
1995: Eu te amo Lucimar, by Lourenço Mutarelli (Vortex)
1999: Seqüelas, by Lourenço Mutarelli (Devir)
2000: O dobro de cinco, by Lourenço Mutarelli (Devir)
2001: O rei do ponto, by Lourenço Mutarelli (Devir)
2002: O Gralha, by many authors (Via Lettera)
2003: 10 na área, um na banheira e ninguém no gol, by many authors (Via Lettera)

Best fiction, adventure and horror album
1991: Bradbury – o papa-defuntos, by Ray Bradbury and many pencillers (L&PM)
1992: Bradbury – o pequeno assassino, by Ray Bradbury and many pencillers (L&PM)
1994: Tex – a marca da serpente (Tex Albo Speciale (Texone) #3), by Claudio Nizzi and Aurelio Galleppini (Globo)
1996: Maus II – a história de um sobrevivente – e foi aí que começaram meus problemas, by Art Spiegelman (Brasiliense)
1997: Sin City – cidade do pecado, by Frank Miller (Globo)
1998: A confluência da forquilha, by Lourenço Mutarelli (Lilás)

Best foreign comic strip
The award considers the Brazilian edition of the works.
1989: Frank e Ernest , by Bob Thaves
1990: Calvin e Haroldo (Calvin and Hobbes) , by Bill Watterson
1991: Calvin e Haroldo (Calvin and Hobbes) , by Bill Watterson
1992: Calvin e Haroldo (Calvin and Hobbes) , by Bill Watterson
1993: Calvin e Haroldo (Calvin and Hobbes) , by Bill Watterson
1994: Calvin e Haroldo (Calvin and Hobbes) , by Bill Watterson
1995: Calvin e Haroldo (Calvin and Hobbes) , by Bill Watterson
1996: Calvin e Haroldo (Calvin and Hobbes) , by Bill Watterson
1997: Dilbert , by Scott Adams
1998: Dilbert , by Scott Adams
1999: Dilbert , by Scott Adams
2000: Snoopy (Peanuts) , by Charles M. Schulz
2001: Dilbert , by Scott Adams
2002: Calvin e Haroldo (Calvin and Hobbes) , by Bill Watterson
2003: Calvin e Haroldo (Calvin and Hobbes) , by Bill Watterson

Best foreign graphic novel
The award considers the Brazilian edition of the works.
1989: Graphic Novel #2: Demolidor (Marvel Graphic Novel #24) , by Frank Miller and Bill Sienkiewicz (Abril)
1990: Graphic Novel #12: Rocketeer (The Rocketeer) , by Dave Stevens (Abril)
1991: Graphic Album #1: Drácula (Marvel Graphic Novel #26) , by Jon J. Muth (Abril Jovem)
1992: Graphic Album #6: Elektra Vive (Elektra Lives Again) , by Frank Miller and Lynn Varley (Abril Jovem)
1993: Graphic Globo #11: Exterminador 17 (Exterminateur 17) , by Jean-Pierre Dionnet and Enki Bilal (Globo)
1994: Wolverine – fúria interior (Wolverine: Inner Fury) , by Dan Chichester and Bill Sienkiewicz (Abril Jovem)
1995: Tex – o grande roubo (Tex Albo Speciale (Texone) #6) , by Claudio Nizzi and José Ortiz (Globo)
1996: Ás inimigo – um poema de guerra (Enemy Ace: War Idyll) , by George Pratt (Abril Jovem)
1997: Tex – o vale do terror (Tex Albo Speciale (Texone) #9) , by Claudio Nizzi e Magnus (Globo)
1998: Lobo/Juiz Dredd – motoqueiros doidos vs. mutantes do inferno (Lobo/Judge Dredd: Psycho Bikers Vs. The Mutants From Hell) , by Alan Grant, John Wagner and Val Semeiks (Abril Jovem)
1999: O Sistema (The System) , by Peter Kuper (Abril Jovem)
2000: Tex Gigante #1: Tex – o homem de Atlanta (Tex Albo Speciale (Texone) #10) , by Claudio Nizzi and Jordi Bernet (Mythos)
2001: Palestina – uma nação ocupada (Palestine) , by Joe Sacco (Conrad)
2002: Gorazde – área de segurança (Safe Area Goražde) , by Joe Sacco (Conrad)
2003: A Paixão do Arlequim (Harlequin Valentine), by Neil Gaiman and John Bolton (Conrad)

Best foreign miniseries
The award considers the Brazilian edition of the works.
1989: Elektra assassina (Elektra: Assassin) , by Frank Miller and Bill Sienkiewicz (Abril)
1990: Orquídea Negra (Black Orchid) , by Neil Gaiman and Dave McKean (Abril Jovem)
1991: V de Vingança (V for Vendetta) , by Alan Moore and David Lloyd (Globo)
1992: Os Livros da Magia (The Books of Magic) , by Neil Gaiman and many pencillers (Abril Jovem)
1993: Batman/Juiz Dredd – julgamento em Gotham (Batman/Judge Dredd: Judgment on Gotham) , by Alan Grant, John Wagner and Simon Bisley (Abril Jovem)
1994: Batman – a espada de Azrael (Batman: Sword of Azrael) , by Denny O'Neil e Joe Quesada (Abril Jovem)
1995: Lobo está morto (Lobo's Back) , by Keith Giffen, Alan Grant and Simon Bisley (Abril Jovem)
1996: Marvels , by Kurt Busiek and Alex Ross (Abril Jovem)
1997: No coração da tempestade (To the Heart of the Storm) , by Will Eisner (Abril Jovem)
1998: O Reino do Amanhã (Kingdom Come) , by Mark Waid and Alex Ross (Abril Jovem)
1999: Batman – preto e branco (Batman Black and White) , by many authors (Abril Jovem)
2000: Ken Parker – onde morrem os titãs (Dove muoiono i Titani) , by Giancarlo Berardi and Ivo Milazzo (CLUQ)
2001: Batman e Tarzan (Batman/Tarzan: Claws of the Cat-woman) , by Ron Marz and Igor Kordey (Mythos)
2002: As aventuras da Liga Extraordinária (The League of Extraordinary Gentlemen) , by Alan Moore and Kevin O'Neill (Pandora)
2003: Wolverine – origem (Origin) , by Paul Jenkins and Andy Kubert (Panini)

Best foreign special edition
The award considers the Brazilian edition of the works.
2004: Sandman – noites sem fim (The Sandman: Endless Nights) , by Neil Gaiman and many pencillers (Conrad)
2005: À sombra das torres ausentes (In the Shadow of No Towers) , by Art Spiegelman (Cia. das Letras)
2006: Maus , by Art Spiegelman (Cia. das Letras)
2007: Corto Maltese – sob o signo de Capricórnio (Sous le signe du Capricorne) , by Hugo Pratt (Pixel)
2008: Persépolis completo (Persepolis) , by Marjane Satrapi (Cia. das Letras)
2009: Asterix e seus amigos (Astérix et ses Amis) , by many authors (Record)
2010: Gênesis (The Book of Genesis) , by Robert Crumb (Conrad)
2011: RanXerox , by Tanino Liberatore and Stefano Tamburini (Conrad)
2012: Asterios Polyp , by David Mazzucchelli (Quadrinhos na Cia)
2013: Pinóquio (Pinocchio) , by Winshluss (Globo)
2014: Pobre Marinheiro (Poor Sailor) , by Sammy Harkham (Balão)
2015: O Quinto Beatle (The Fifth Beatle) , by Vivek J. Tiwary, Andrew C. Robinson and Kyle Baker (Aleph)
2016: Pílulas azuis (Pilules Bleues) , by Frederik Peeters (Nemo)
2017: The Ghost in the Shell (Kōkaku Kidōtai) , by Masamune Shirow (JBC)
2018: Moby Dick , by Christophe Chabouté (Pipoca & Nanquim)
2019: Mort Cinder , by Héctor Germán Oesterheld and Alberto Breccia (Figura)
2020: O Eternauta 1969 (El Eternauta) , by Héctor Germán Oesterheld and Alberto Breccia (Comix Zone)

Best graphic humor publication
This category was merged from "	Best Caricatures Publication", "Best Cartoons Publication" and "Best Editorial Cartoons Publication".
2012: Uma Patada Com Carinho, by Chiquinha (Leya/Barba Negra)
2013: Se a vida fosse como a internet, by Pablo Carranza (Beleléu)
2014: Os Grandes Artistas da Mad – Sergio Aragonés (MAD’s Greatest Artists: Sergio Aragonés: Five Decades of His Finest Works), by Sergio Aragonés (Panini)
2015: Có! & Birds, by Gustavo Duarte (Quadrinhos na Cia)
2016: Ah, como era boa a Ditadura..., by Luiz Gê (Quadrinhos na Cia)

Best graphic project
1989: Chiclete com Banana, by Angeli (Circo)
1990: Martins Fontes
1991: Chiclete com Banana, by Angeli (Circo)
1992: Fragmentos completos (Revista Goodyear Especial), by Luiz Gê
1993: Momotaro – o menino pêssego, by Newton Foot (Ponkã)
1994: Território dos bravos, by Luiz Gê (34)
1995: Ken Parker – os cervos & um hálito de gelo (Cuccioli / Un alito di ghiaccio), by Giancarlo Berardi and Ivo Milazzo (Ensaio)
1996: Rolling Stones – Voodoo Lounge , by Dave McKean (Abril Jovem)
1997: No coração da tempestade (To the Heart of the Storm), by Will Eisner (Abril Jovem)
1998: Graffiti 76% Quadrinhos, by many authors (independent)
1999: Graffiti 76% Quadrinhos, by many authors (independent)
2000: Graffiti 76% Quadrinhos, by many authors (independent)
2001: Graffiti 76% Quadrinhos, by many authors (independent)
2002: Fábrica de Quadrinhos, by many authors (Devir)
2003: Ragú Cordel, by many authors (independent)
2004: Front, by many authors (Companhia das Letras)
2005: À sombra das torres ausentes (In the Shadow of No Towers), by Art Spiegelman (Companhia das Letras)
2006: Cidades Ilustradas – Salvador / Cidades Ilustradas – Belém, by Marcello Quintanilha (Salvador) and Jean-Claude Denis (Belém) (Casa 21)
2007: Sandman, by Neil Gaiman and many pencillers
2008: Laertevisão – coisas que não esqueci, by Laerte
2019: Box Noites de Trevas – Metal x Sepultura (Panini)
2020: Cartas Para Ninguém, by Diana Salu

Best horror album
1989: Saga de terror, by Jayme Cortez (Martins Fontes)
1990: Dr. Jekil
2001: Do Inferno (From Hell), by Alan Moore and Eddie Campbell (Via Lettera)
2002: No reino do terror, by R. F. Lucchetti (Opera Graphica)
2003: Calafrio – 20 anos depois, many authors (Opera Graphica)

Best horror comic book
1990: Sandman, by Neil Gaiman and many pencillers (Globo)
1991: Sandman, by Neil Gaiman and many pencillers (Globo)
1992: Sandman, by Neil Gaiman and many pencillers (Globo)
1993: Sandman, by Neil Gaiman and many pencillers (Globo)
1994: Calafrio, by many authors (D-Arte)
1995: Hotel do Terror, by Flavio Coin (Otacomix)
1996: Coleção Assombração, by many authors (Ediouro)
1998: Vertigo DC #1: Monstro do Pântano – lição de anatomia (The Saga of the Swamp Thing #21), by Alan Moore, Stephen Bissette and John Totleben (Metal Pesado)
1999: Manticore Especial, by Gian Danton, Antonio Eder, José Aguiar, Luciano Lagares and Márcio Freire (Monalisa)
2000: Manticore Especial, by Gian Danton, Antonio Eder, José Aguiar, Luciano Lagares and Márcio Freire (Monalisa)
2003: Sandman, by Neil Gaiman and many pencillers (Brianstore)

Best horror publication
2004: Contos bizarros, by many authors (Abril)
2005: Dylan Dog, by many authors (Mythos)
2006: Dylan Dog, by many authors (Mythos)
2007: Os mortos-vivos – dias passados (The Walking Dead #1–6), by Robert Kirkman and Tony Moore (HQM)
2008: Black Hole, by Charles Burns (Conrad)

Best humor album
1989: Calvin & Haroldo – algo babando embaixo da cama (Something Under the Bed Is Drooling), by Bill Watterson (Cedibra)
1990: Ed Mort em conexão nazista, by Luis Fernando Veríssimo and Miguel Paiva (L&PM)
1991: Sir Ney – que rei fui eu, by Novaes (Ícone)
1992: Toda Mafalda, by Quino (Martins Fontes)
1993: Avenida Brasil – assim caminha a modernidade, by Paulo Caruso (Globo)
1994: Mafalda Inédita, by Quino (Martins Fontes)
1995: Los 3 amigos 2 – más sexo, más drogas y más guacamoles, by Angeli, Glauco and Laerte (Ensaio)
1996: Gato e Gata, by Laerte (Circo / Ensaio)
1997: Avenida Brasil – o conjunto nacional, by Paulo Caruso (Globo)
1998: Aline e seus dois namorados, by Adão Iturrusgarai
1999: O homem ideal (Der bewegte Mann), by Ralf König (Via Lettera)
2000: Níquel Náusea – os ratos também choram, by Fernando Gonsales (Bookmakers)
2001: Luke & Tantra, by Angeli (Devir)
2002: Classificados, by Laerte (Devir)
2003: Níquel Náusea – com mil demônios, by Fernando Gonsales (Devir)

Best humor comic book
1989: Chiclete com Banana, by Angeli (Circo)
1990: Chiclete com Banana Especial #3: Los tres amigos, by Angeli, Glauco and Laerte (Circo)
1991: Piratas do Tietê, by Laerte (Circo)
1992: Piratas do Tietê, by Laerte (Circo)
1993: Níquel Náusea, by Fernando Gonsales (VHD Diffusion)
1994: Striptiras, by Laerte (Circo / Sampa)
1995: Big Bang Bang, by Adão Iturrusgarai (Circo)
1996: Rê Bordosa – memórias de uma porraloca, by Angeli (Circo)
1997: Casseta & Planeta em quadrinhos (Press)
1998: O Onanista
1999: Sergio Aragonés massacra a Marvel (Sergio Aragonés Massacres Marvel), by Sergio Aragonés (Abril Jovem)
2000: Bundas, by many authors
2001: Bundas, by many authors
2002: Mad, by many authors (Mythos)
2003: Grump, by Orlandeli (Escala)

Best humor publication
This category was merged from "Best Humor Album" and "Best Humor Comic Book".
2004: OPasquim21, by many authors
2005: Preto no branco, by Allan Sieber (Conrad)
2006: Pif Paf, by Millôr Fernandes (Argumento)
2007: Níquel Náusea – tédio no chiqueiro, by Fernando Gonsales (Devir)
2008: Piratas do Tietê – a saga completa, by Laerte (Devir)
2009: Piratas do Tietê – a saga completa – livro 3, by Laerte (Devir)
2010: É tudo mais ou menos verdade – jornalismo investigativo, tendencioso e ficcional de Allan Sieber, by Allan Sieber (Desiderata)
2016: Guia Culinário do Falido, by many authors (Balão)
2017: A Última Bailarina Contra-Ataca, by Guilherme de Sousa (Korja dos Quadrinhos)
2018: Marcatti 40, by many authors (Ugra Press)
2019: Agente Sommos e o Beliscão Atômico, by Flávio Luiz Nogueira (Papel A2 Texto & Arte)
2020: Hell, No! Bem vindo ao inferno, by Leo Finocchi (Balão)

Best illustration book
2000: Arquivo em imagens (série Última Hora) (Imprensa Oficial)
2001: Lábaro estrelado, by J. Carlos / Cássio Loredano, organizer and Luciano Trigo, text (Casa da Palavra)

Best independent group publication
2008: Quadrinhópole #4
2009: Café Espacial
2010: Café Espacial
2011: Café Espacial
2012: Café Espacial
2013: Petisco Apresenta I
2014: Café Espacial #12
2015: QUAD 2
2016: O Gralha – Artbook
2017: São Paulo dos Mortos – Volume 3
2018: Orixás – Em Guerra
2019: Orixás – Renascimento, by Alex Mir, Germana Viana, Laudo Ferreira and Omar Viñole
2020: VHS: Video Horror Show

Best independent publication
Until 2003, this category was called "Best Independent Comic Book"; and, from 2008, this category was split into "Best Independent Group Publication", "Best Independent Pocket Publication", "Best Independent Single Edition Publication" and "Best Independent Sole Publication".
1989: Ventosa, by Marcatti
1990: Lôdo, by Marcatti
1991: Dundum Quadrinhos, by Adão Iturrusgarai and Gilmar Rodrigues, editors
1992: Dundum Quadrinhos, by Adão Iturrusgarai and Gilmar Rodrigues, editors
1993: RxDxPx Comix, by Marcatti and João Gordo
1994: Revista do Ota, by Ota
1995: Panacea, by José Mauro Kazi, editor
1996: Antologia da Manha
1997: Gibizon Radicci, by Iotti
1998: Glória, Glória, Aleluia!, by Allan Sieber
1999: Caliban, by Wellington Srbek, editor
2000: Jane Mastodonte, by Flávio Luís
2001: Hipocampo, by Amaral
2002: Ragú, by Lin and Mascaro, editores
2003: Top! Top!, by Henrique Magalhães
2004: Desventuras de Fráuzio, by Marcatti
2005: Mosh!, by S. Lobo and Renato Lima, editors
2006: Mosh!, by S. Lobo and Renato Lima, editors
2007: 10 Pãezinhos – um dia, uma noite, by Gabriel Bá and Fábio Moon

Best independent pocket publication
2008: Juke Box #4, by Renato Lima, editor

Best independent single edition publication
Until 2010, this category was called "Best Independent Special Publication".
2008: O relógio insano, by Eloar Guazzelli
2009: Depois da Meia-noite, by Laudo Ferreira Jr. and Omar Viñole
2010: Có!, by Gustavo Duarte
2011: Taxi, by Gustavo Duarte
2012: O louco, a caixa e o homem, by Daniel Esteves and Will
2013: Km Blues, by Daniel Esteves, Wanderson de Souza and Wagner de Souza
2014: O Monstro, by Fabio Coala
2015: Quaisqualigundum, by Davi Calil and Roger Cruz
2016: Uma Aventura de Verne & Mauá – Mil Léguas Transamazônicas, by Will and Spacca
2017: The Hype, by Marcel Ibaldo and Max Andrade
2018: Alho-Poró, by Bianca Pinheiro
2019: Os Últimos Dias do Xerife, by Thiago Ossostortos
2020: Último Assalto, by Daniel Esteves and Alex Rodrigues

Best independent sole publication
2008: Menino Caranguejo #1, by Chicolam
2009: Nanquim Descartável, by Daniel Esteves
2010: Nanquim Descartável, by Daniel Esteves
2011: O Cabra, by Flávio Luiz
2012: Birds, by Gustavo Duarte
2013: Quadrinhos A2 – segunda temporada, by Cristina Eiko and Paulo Crumbim
2014: Beijo Adolescente 2, by Rafael Coutinho
2015: Edgar 1, by Gustavo Borges
2016: Beco do Rosário, by Ana Luiza Koehler
2017: Opala 76, by Eduardo Ferigato
2018: Alho-Poró, by Bianca Pinheiro
2019: Histórias Tristes e Piadas Ruins, by Laura Athayde
2020: São Francisco, by Gabriela Güllich and João Velozo

Best miniseries publication
This category was merged from "Best National Miniseries" and "Best Foreign Miniseries"; and, until 2016, this category was called "Best Miniseries".
2004: Ronin, by Frank Miller (Opera Graphica)
2005: 1602 (Marvel 1602), by Neil Gaiman and Andy Kubert (Panini)
2006: Superman – identidade secreta (Superman: Secret Identity), by Kurt Busiek and Stuart Immonen (Panini)
2007: Adolf (Adolf ni Tsugu), by Osamu Tezuka (Conrad)
2008: Fábulas – 1001 noites (1001 Nights of Snowfall), by Bill Willingham and many pencillers (Pixel)
2016: Ditadura no Ar No. 4, by Raphael Fernandes and Abel (independent) / Pátria Armada # 1, 2, by Klebs Júnior (Impulso HQ)
2017: Quack – Volume 3, by Kaji Pato (Draco)
2018: Xampu, by Roger Cruz (Panini)
2019: Greg – o contador de histórias, by Marcio R. Gotland (Náutilo HQ)
2020: Akira 6, by Katsuhiro Otomo (JBC)

Best mix publication
Until 2003, this category was called "Best Mix Comic Book".
1989: Animal (VHD Diffusion)
1990: Animal (VHD Diffusion)
1991: Animal (VHD Diffusion)
1992: Mil Perigos(Dealer)
1994: Graphic Rock #1: John Lennon – tributo (Nova Sampa)
1995: Lúcifer (Circo)
1996: Lúcifer (Circo)
1997: Heavy Metal (Heavy Metal)
1998: Metal Pesado – tudo em quadrinhos (Metal Pesado)
1999: Cybercomix (Bookmakers)
2000: Graffiti 76% Quadrinhos (independent)
2001: Canalha (Brainstore)
2002: Front (Via Lettera)
2003: Front (Via Lettera)
2004: Front (Via Lettera)
2005: Mosh! (independent)
2006: Mosh! (independent)
2007: Front No. 17 (Via Lettera)
2008: Pixel Magazine (Pixel)
2009: Graffiti 76% Quadrinhos nº 18 (independent)
2010: MSP 50 – Mauricio de Sousa por 50 artistas (Panini)
2011: MSP +50 – Mauricio de Sousa por mais 50 artistas (Panini)
2012: MSP Novos 50 – Mauricio de Sousa por 50 novos artistas (Panini)
2013: Creepy – Contos Clássicos de Terror – Volume Um (Devir)
2014: Friquinique (independent)
2015: Gibi Quântico (independent)
2016: O Rei Amarelo em quadrinhos (Draco)
2017: O Despertar de Cthulhu em Quadrinhos (Draco)
2018: Baiacu (Todavia) / Marcatti 40 (Ugra Press)
2019: Gibi de Menininha (Zarabatana)
2020: Mulheres & Quadrinhos, by Dani Marino and Laluña Machado (Skript)

Best national comic strip
1989: Geraldão, by Glauco
1990: Níquel Náusea, by Fernando Gonsales
1991: Níquel Náusea, by Fernando Gonsales
1992: Níquel Náusea, by Fernando Gonsales
1993: Los Três Amigos, by Angeli, Glauco and Laerte
1994: Níquel Náusea, by Fernando Gonsales
1995: Níquel Náusea, by Fernando Gonsales
1996: Família Brasil, by Luis Fernando Verissimo
1997: Níquel Náusea, by Fernando Gonsales
1998: Striptiras, by Laerte
1999: Piratas do Tietê, by Laerte
2000: Aline, by Adão Iturrusgarai
2001: Aline, by Adão Iturrusgarai
2002: Níquel Náusea, by Fernando Gonsales
2003: Piratas do Tietê, by Laerte
2004: Níquel Náusea, by Fernando Gonsales
2005: Piratas do Tietê and Striptiras, by Laerte
2006: Piratas do Tietê, by Laerte
2007: Piratas do Tietê, by Laerte
2008: Níquel Náusea, by Fernando Gonsales
2009: Níquel Náusea, by Fernando Gonsales
2010: Malvados, by André Dahmer
2011: Piratas do Tietê, by Laerte
2012: Manual do Minotauro, by Laerte
2013: Níquel Náusea, by Fernando Gonsales
2014: Manual do Minotauro, by Laerte
2015: Malvados, by André Dahmer

Best national graphic novel
1992: Graphic Dealer #1: Transubstanciação, by Lourenço Mutarelli (Dealer)
1993: Graphic Dealer #2: O negócio do Sertão – como descolar uma grana no séc. XVII, by André Toral (Dealer)
1994: Desgraçados, by Lourenço Mutarelli (Vidente)
1995: Mulher-Diaba no rastro de Lampião, by Ataíde Braz and Flavio Colin (Sampa)
1996: À meia-noite levarei sua alma, by José Mojica Marins and Laudo Ferreira Jr. (Sampa)
1997: O Vira-Lata, by Paulo Garfunkel and Líbero Malavoglia (Paladinos de Onan)
1998: O Vira-Lata, by Paulo Garfunkel and Líbero Malavoglia (Paladinos de Onan)
1999: Lampião – era o cavalo do tempo atrás da besta da vida, by Klévisson Viana (Hedra)
2000: A estranha turma do Zé do Caixão, by Alexandre Montandon and Alexandre Dias (Brainstore)
2001: Fawcett, by André Diniz and Flavio Colin (Nona Arte)
2002: Estórias Gerais, by Wellington Srbek and Flavio Colin (Conrad)
2003: Fantasmagoriana, by Wellington Srbek and Flavio Colin (independent)

Best national miniseries
1999: Lua dos dragões, by Marcelo Cassaro and André Vazzios (Trama)
2001: Combo Rangers Revolution, by Fabio Yabu and Ulisses Pérez (JBC)
2002: Pindorama – a outra história do Brasil, by Lailson de Holanda Cavalcanti (Diário de Pernambuco)

Best national special edition
2004: A moça que namorou com o bode, by Klévisson Viana (Tupynanquim / Coqueiro)
2005: 10 Pãezinhos – crítica, by Fábio Moon and Gabriel Bá (Devir)
2006: Santô e os pais da aviação, by Spacca (Cia. das Letras)
2007: 10 Pãezinhos – mesa para dois, by Fábio Moon and Gabriel Bá (Devir)
2008: Laertevisão – coisas que não esqueci, by Laerte (Conrad)
2009: Mesmo Delivery, by Rafael Grampá (Desiderata)
2010: MSP 50 – Mauricio de Sousa por 50 artistas, by many authors (Panini)
2011: Bando de dois, by Danilo Beyruth (Zarabatana)
2012: Morro da Favela, by André Diniz (Leya/Barba Negra)
2013: Astronauta - Magnetar, by Danilo Beyruth (Panini)
2014: Turma da Mônica - Laços, by Vitor Cafaggi and Lu Cafaggi (Panini)
2015: A Vida de Jonas, by Magno Costa (Zarabatana)
2016: La Dansarina, by Lillo Parra and Jefferson Costa (Quadro a Quadro)
2017: Yeshuah – Absoluto, by Laudo Ferreira (Devir)
2018: Angola Janga, by Marcelo D'Salete (Veneta)
2019: Jeremias – Pele, by Rafael Calça and Jefferson Costa (Panini)
2020: Roseira, Medalha e Engenho, by Jefferson Costa (Pipoca & Nanquim)

Best prozine
2005: Putzgrila
2006: Areia Hostil, by Lorde Lobo, editor
2007: A mosca no copo de vidro e outras histórias

Best serial comic book
1992: Akira, by Katsuhiro Otomo (Globo)
1993: Liga da Justiça, by many authors (Abril Jovem)
1994: Sandman, by Neil Gaiman and many pencillers (Globo)
1995: Sandman, by Neil Gaiman and many pencillers (Globo)
1996: Vertigo, by many authors (Abril Jovem)
1997: Gen¹³, by Jim Lee, Brandon Choi and J. Scott Campbell (Globo)
1998: Spawn, by Todd McFarlane (Abril Jovem)
1999: Preacher, by Garth Ennis and Steve Dillon (Metal Pesado)
2000: Spawn, by Todd McFarlane (Abril Jovem)
2001: Dragon Ball, by Akira Toriyama (Conrad)
2002: Holy Avenger, by Marcelo Cassaro and Erica Awano (Trama)
2003: Holy Avenger, by Marcelo Cassaro and Erica Awano (Talismã)

Best special edition
From 2004, this category was split into National and Foreign Special Editions.
1989: Anos de ouro do Pato Donald, by many authors (Abril Jovem)
1990: Batman – ano um (Batman: Year One), by Frank Miller and David Mazzucchelli (Abril Jovem)
1991: Lex Luthor – biografia não-autorizada (Lex Luthor: The Unauthorized Biography), by James D. Hudnall and Eduardo Barreto (Abril Jovem)
1992: Asilo Arkham – uma séria casa num sério mundo (Arkham Asylum: A Serious House on Serious Earth), by Grant Morrison and Dave McKean (Abril Jovem)
1993: A arte de Rodolfo Zalla, by Rodolfo Zalla (D-Arte)
1994: Fumetti – o melhor dos quadrinhos italianos, by many authors (Globo)
1995: Pato Donald – 60 Anos, by may authors (Abril Jovem)
1996: Batman #1: Batman – a queda do morcego – a vitória de Bane (Batman: Knightfall: Broken Bat), by many authors (Abril Jovem)
1997: Almanaque do Faroeste (Almanacco del West 1996), by Claudio Nizzi and Andrea Venturi (Globo)
1998: Metal Pesado – tudo em quadrinhos – edição comemorativa – 15 Anos Gibiteca de Curitiba, by many authors (Metal Pesado)
1999: Linha de ataque – futebol arte, by many authors (Abril Jovem)
2000: Super-Homem – paz na Terra (Superman: Peace on Earth), by Alex Ross and Paul Dini (Abril Jovem)
2001: Restolhada, by Marcatti (Opera Graphica)
2002: Saino a percurá, by Lelis (independent)
2003: Filho do urso e outras histórias, by Flavio Colin (Opera Graphica)

Best theoretical book
1989: Esses incríveis heróis de papel, by Ionaldo Cavalcanti (Mater)
1990: Ecad, cadê o meu? – uma bem humorada cartilha sobre o direito autoral na música popular, by José Carlos Costa Netto and Paulo Caruso (Mil Folhas)
1991: Quadrinhos e arte seqüencial (Comics and Sequential Art), by Will Eisner (Martins Fontes)
1992: Mangá – o poder dos quadrinhos japoneses, by Sonia Bibe Buyten (Hedra)
1994: O que é fanzine, by Henrique Magalhães (Brasiliense)
1995: História da história em quadrinhos, by Álvaro de Moya (Brasiliense)
1996: Desvendando os quadrinhos (Understanding Comics), by Scott McCloud (Makron Books)
1997: O mundo de Walt Disney, by Álvaro de Moya (Geração)
1998: Feras do humor baiano, by Gutenberg Cruz (Empresa Gráfica da Bahia) / Humor diário – a ilustração humorística do Diário de Pernambucano (1914–1996), by Lailson de Holanda Cavalcanti (UFPE)
1999: O Rio de J. Carlos, by Zuenir Ventura and Cássio Loredano (Lacerda / Prefeitura do Rio de Janeiro)
2000: História (nem sempre) bem-humorada de Pernambuco – 140 caricaturas do século XIX – volume 1, by Graça Ataíde and Rosário Andrade (Bagaço)
2002: Quadrinhos, sedução e paixão, by Moacy Cirne (Vozes)
2003: Tá rindo do quê? – um mergulho nos Salões de Humor de Piracicaba, by Camilo Riani (Unimep)
2004: Vapt! Vupt!, by Álvaro de Moya (Clemente Guarani)
2005: A Guerra dos Gibis – a formação do mercado editorial brasileiro e a censura aos quadrinhos, 1933–1964, by Gonçalo Junior (Companhia das Letras)
2006: Narrativas gráficas (Graphic Storytelling and Visual Narrative), by Will Eisner (Devir)
2007: O Tico-Tico – centenário da primeira revista de quadrinhos do Brasil, by Waldomiro Vergueiro and Roberto Elísio dos Santos, organizers (Opera Graphica)
2008: Desenhando quadrinhos (Making Comics), by Scott McCloud (M. Books)
2009: Henfil – o humor subversivo, by Márcio Malta (Expressão Popular)
2010: A leitura dos quadrinhos, by Paulo Ramos (Contexto)
2011: Bienvenido – um passeio pelos quadrinhos argentinos, by Paulo Ramos (Zarabatana)
2012: Angelo Agostini – a imprensa ilustrada da Corte à Capital Federal, 1864–1910, by Gilberto Marangoni (Devir)
2013: E Benício criou a mulher, by Gonçalo Junior (Opera Graphica)
2014: Marvel Comics – A história secreta (Marvel Comics: The Untold Story), by Sean Howe (Leya Brasil)
2015: Humor Paulistano – A Experiência da Circo Editorial, 1984–1995, by Toninho Mendes (Sesi-SP Editora)
2016: Imageria – O nascimento das histórias em quadrinhos, by Rogério de Campos (Veneta)
2017: 1973, Quando Tudo Começou! – História do 1º Salão Brasileiro de Humor e Quadrinhos, by many authors (independent)
2018: Desaplanar (Unflattening), by Nick Sousanis (Veneta)
2019: Tradução de Histórias em Quadrinhos, by Carol Pimentel (Transitiva)
2020: Mulheres & Quadrinhos, by Dani Marino and Laluña Machado (Skript)

Best webcomic
Until 2007, this category was called "Best Comics' Website".
1998: Gibindex
1999: Cybercomix, by many authors
2000: Cybercomix, by many authors
2001: Cybercomix, by many authors
2002: Nona Arte, by André Diniz, editor
2003: Nona Arte, by André Diniz, editor
2004: Nona Arte, by André Diniz, editor
2005: Nona Arte, by André Diniz, editor
2006: Nona Arte, by André Diniz, editor
2007: Mundo Canibal
2008: Malvados, by André Dahmer
2009: Quadrinhos ordinários, by Rafael Sica
2010: Dinamite & Raio-Laser, by Samuel Fonseca
2011: Linha do Trem, by Raphael Salimena
2012: Terapia, by Rob Gordon, Marina Kurcis and Mario Cau
2013: Feira da Fruta, by many authors
2014: Terapia, by Rob Gordon, Marina Kurcis and Mario Cau
2015: Beladona, by Ana Recalde and Denis Mello
2016: Quadrinhos Ácidos, by Pedro Leite
2017: As Empoderadas, by Germana Viana
2018: Hell No! Meu pai é o diabo, by Leo Finocchi
2019: Bendita Cura, by Mário César
2020: Bendita Cura, by Mário César

Best webcomic strip
2012: Um Sábado Qualquer, by Carlos Ruas
2013: Vida Besta, by Galvão
2014: Overdose Homeopática, by Marco Oliveira
2015: Will Tirando, by Will Leite
2016: Ryot IRAS, by Ryot
2017: Linha do Trem, by Raphael Salimena
2018: Will Tirando, by Will Leite
2010: Will Tirando, by Will Leite
2020: Tirinhas do Silva João, by Silva João

Best western comic book
1989: Ken Parker, by Giancarlo Berardi and Ivo Milazzo

Best youth publication
2016: Turma da Mônica: Lições, by Vitor Cafaggi and Lu Cafaggi (Panini)
2017: Mônica: Força, by Bianca Pinheiro (Panini)
2018: Chico Bento: Arvorada, by Orlandeli (Panini)
2019: Jeremias: Pele, by Rafael Calça and Jefferson Costa (Panini)
2020: Tina: Respeito, by Fefê Torquato (Panini)

Special manga
2016: Quack – Patadas Voadoras, by Kaji Pato (Draco)

Academic

Best doctoral thesis
2007: As histórias em quadrinhos como informação imagética integrada ao ensino universitário, by Gazy Andraus (USP)
2008: O fato gráfico: o humor gráfico como gênero jornalístico, by Jorge Arbach (USP)
2009: O potencial das histórias em quadrinhos na formação de leitores: busca de um contraponto entre os panoramas culturais brasileiro e europeu, by Valéria Aparecida Bari (USP)
2011: Arquitetura e urbanismo, por Quem não chora não mama! – panorama do design gráfico brasileiro através do humor 1837–1931, by José Mendes André (USP)
2013: Comunicando a cidade em quadrinhos: do narrar ao fabular nos romances gráficos de Will Eisner, by Marília Santana Borges (PUC-SP)
2014: O reencantamento do mundo em quadrinhos: Uma análise de Promethea, de Alan Moore e J. H. Wiliams III, by Carlos Manoel de Hollanda Cavalcanti (UFRJ)
2015: Sindicalismo, Piratas e Cabelo Chanel: leituras e reciclagem cultural em obras, by Cláudio José Meneses de Oliveira (UFBA)
2016: Os Sentidos dos Quadrinhos em Contexto Nacional-Popular (Brasil e Chile, Anos 1960 e 1970), by Ivan Gomes (UFF)
2017: Caricatas: Arte-Rostohumor-Experiência, by Camilo Riani (Unesp)
2018: Tecnologia e cultura nos quadrinhos independentes brasileiros, by Líber Eugenio Paz (UTFPR)
2019: A escola no túnel do tempo: imaginários sociodiscursivos e efeitos de sentido em charges contemporâneas sobre a educação e ontem e de hoje, by Eveline Coelho Cardoso (UFF)
2020: Quadrinhos no Rio Grande do Sul: Um Momento Decisivo – O Humor Gráfico em Debate & As Produções de Sampaulo, Santiago e Edgar Vasques na Formação de um Polissistema, by Vinicius da Silva Rodrigues (UFRGS)

Best graduation academic work
2007: HQ: a nona arte, by Daniela de Andrade Santana, Janaina Guimarães Monteiro, Priscila Sodré Portilho da Silva and Vivian Lima Conesa (Anhembi)
2008: Na Bodega, Colóquio Ilustrado, by Gil Tókio (USP)
2009: A quarta dimensão do trabalho de Breccia, by Pedro Franz Broering (UFSC)
2010: As Histórias em quadrinhos e o cinema: as artes irmãs, by Adriano Di Benedetto (USP)
2011: Letras, por Quixote de Cerveisner – estudo comparativo entre o capítulo VIII do Quixote de Cervantes e sua adaptação para os quadrinhos por Will Eisner, by Leonardo Poglia Vidal (Unisinos)
2012: Traços e rabiscos nos anos 80 – o trabalho de Henfil na década da transição, by Fernanda de Alcântara Pestana and Luciana Fernandes dos Reis (Cásper Líbero)
2013: Jean Monteiro
2014: A trajetória de Kamui Shirou: a representação da sociedade japonesa refletida nos mangás, by Luiz Henrique Bezerra (PUC-PR)
2015: Histórias em quadrinhos online: a prototipagem da webcomic "Frankestino", by Maria Fernanda Milão Fuscaldo (PUC-RS)
2016: 'A representação da Segunda Guerra Mundial em Alguns Quadrinhos Japoneses, by Renan Suchmacher (UFRJ)
2017: Web Série Vozes e Traços O Novo Cenário Brasileiro de HQs, by Bruna Penilhas, Daniel Generalli, Juliana Frezarin and Lucas Alencar (Umesp)
2018: Naruna – Uma história sobre esculpir travessias, by Mayara Lista Alcantara (UFRJ)
2019: Webcomics dos Átomos aos bits, by Cicero Henrique da Cruz Sampaio (Universidade Regional do Cariri)
2020: Quadrinhos e Matemática: Algumas Possíveis Construções Usando a Imaginação, by Leandro Carlos Blum (UFRGS)

Best masters dissertation
2007: O ensino da arte e produção de histórias em quadrinhos no ensino fundamental, by João Marcos Parreira Mendonça (UFMG)
2008: O desenho moderno de Saul Steinberg: obra e contexto, by Daniel Bueno (USP)
2009: Considerações sobre sociedade e tecnologia a partir da poética e linguagem dos quadrinhos de Lourenço Mutarelli no período de 1988 a 2006, by Líber Eugenio Paz (UTFPR)
2010: Histórias em quadrinhos e o ensino de ciências nas séries iniciais: estabelecendo relações para o ensino de conteúdos curriculares procedimentais, by Mariana Vaitiekunas Pizarro (Unesp)
2011: Suehiro Maruo: o sublime e o abjeto como estética da existência, by Marcia Casturino (EBA-UFRJ)
2012: Entre a épica e a paródia: a (des)mistificação do gaucho nos quadrinhos de Inodoro Pereyra, el renegáu, by Priscila Pereira (Unicamp)
2013: Educação para Abolição: charges e histórias em quadrinhos no Segundo Reinado, by Thiago Vasconcellos Modenesi (UFPE)
2014: Entre álbum e leitor: traços da vida comum e do homem ordinário no movimento da nouvelle mangá, by Tiago Canário (UFBA)
2015: Ela não pode ser assim tão fofa! Apropriação e circulação de mangás Lolicon, by Natália Marques Cavalcante de Oliveira (UFSC)
2016: Falando de Quadrinhos: A Influência do Letreiramento nas Histórias em Quadrinhos, by Marjorie Yamada (UnB)
2017: Tudo o que o cidadão deve saber: As Cartilhas e o Processo Civilizador, by Miguel Geraldo Mendes Reis (PUC-Rio)
2018: O Processo de legitimação cultural das histórias em quadrinhos, by Beatriz Sequeira de Carvalho (USP)
2019: Batman e o Surrealismo: uma investigação das estratégias poéticas surrealista dentro do Asilo Arkham, by Valter do Carmo Moreira (UEL)
2020: O Tempo Multidimensional nos Quadrinhos: Um Estudo das Estratégias Narrativas em Here, de Richard McGuire, by Cátia Ana Baldoíno da Silva (UFG)

Best research
From 2007 this category was split into "Best Doctoral Thesis", "Best Graduation Academic Work" and "Best Masters Dissertation".
1989: O poder de difusão das histórias em quadrinhos japonesas como reflexo da sociedade nipônica, by Sonia Luyten (USP)
1997: A incrível guerra dos gibis, by Gonçalo Junior
1998: Phenix, by Wagner Augusto
2002: Uma história do Brasil através da caricatura: 1840–2001, by Renato Lemos, organizer (Bom Texto / Letras & Expressões)
2004: O Tico-Tico: um marco nas histórias em quadrinhos no Brasil (1905–1962), by Maria Cristina Merlo (USP)
2005: A escrita plástica, desenho, pensamento e conhecimento, by Luiz Gê (USP)
2006: Humor e populismo: o desafio diário nas charges de Nelo Lorenzon (1948–1960), by Andréa Araújo Nogueira (USP)

Others

Best animated cartoon
1995: Liquid Television, by Japhet Asher
1996: The Maxx, by Sam Kieth and Bill Messner-Loebs
1997: Cassiopéia, by Clóvis Viera, director
1998: A vida moderna de Rocko (Rocko's Modern Life), by Joe Murray
1999: KaBlam!, by Robert Mittenthal, Will McRobb and Chris Viscardi

Best animated cartoon (feature film)
2000: Toy Story 2, by John Lasseter, director
2001: A fuga das galinhas (Chicken Run), by Peter Lord and Nick Park
2002: Shrek, by Andrew Adamson and Vicky Jenson, directors
2003: A era do gelo (Ice Age), by Chris Wedge and Carlos Saldanha

Best animated cartoon (short film)
2000: Deus é Pai, by Allan Sieber
2001: Os idiotas mesmo, by Allan Sieber
2002: For the birds, by Ralph Eggleston, director

Best animated cartoon for tv
2000: O laboratório de Dexter (Dexter's Laboratory), by Genndy Tartakovsky
2001: Rugrats, by Arlene Klasky, Gábor Csupó and Paul Germain
2002: Bob Esponja Calça Quadrada (SpongeBob SquarePants), by Stephen Hillenburg
2003: Bob Esponja Calça Quadrada (SpongeBob SquarePants), by Stephen Hillenburg

Best animation
2005: A Liga dos VJs Paladinos, by Marco Pavão
2006: Cartoon Network Brasil's national vignettes, by many authors
2007: Wood & Stock: Sexo, Orégano e Rock'n'Roll, by Otto Guerra
2008: Uma Aventura no Tempo, by Mauricio de Sousa

Best author's website
2004: Vida Besta, by Galvão
2005: Vida Besta, by Galvão 
2006: O mundo maravilhoso de Adão Iturrusgarai, by Adão Iturrusgarai
2007: Samuel Casal – ilustrador, by Samuel Casal
2008: Quadrinhofilia, by José Aguiar

Best blog / flog of graphic artist
2004: Os Loucos Underground, by Fábio Moon and Gabriel Bá
2005: Os Loucos Underground, by Fábio Moon and Gabriel Bá
2006: Os Loucos Underground, by Fábio Moon and Gabriel Bá
2007: Os Loucos Underground, by Fábio Moon and Gabriel Bá
2008: Furry Water, by Rafael Grampá

Best blog about comics
2008: Blog dos Quadrinhos

Best comic store
1989: Livraria Muito Prazer
1990: Livraria Muito Prazer
1997: Livraria Muito Prazer
1998: Itiban Comic Shop
1999: Merlin Comic Store
2000: Devir Livraria

Best event
2004: Festival Internacional de Quadrinhos
2005: Ilustra Brasil
2006: Festival Internacional de Quadrinhos
2007: Ilustra Brasil
2008: Festival Internacional de Quadrinhos
2009: Bistecão Ilustrado
2010: Festival Internacional de Quadrinhos
2011: Rio Comicon
2012: Festival Internacional de Quadrinhos
2013: Gibicon
2014: Festival Internacional de Quadrinhos
2015: Comic Con Experience
2016: Comic Con Experience
2017: Comic Con Experience
2018: Comic Con Experience
2019: Comic Con Experience
2020: Butantã Gibicon

Best exhibition
1989: Arquitetura em quadrinhos (São Paulo Museum of Art)
1990: Alain Voss (Museu da Imagem e do Som)
1998: Sem AIDS com amor (Bienal Internacional de Humor)
1999: Salão Internacional de Piracicaba (Engenho Central)
2000: Angeli, o Matador (Festival Internacional de Quadrinhos)
2001: Humores nunca dantes navegados – o descobrimento segundo os cartunistas do Sul do Brasil (São Pedro Theatre)
2002: História em Quadrões
2003: Laerte por Laerte (Museu de Artes Gráficas)
2004: Mozart Couto (Festival Internacional de Quadrinhos)
2005: São Paulo por Paulo Caruso – um olhar bem-humorado sobre esta cidade
2006: Henfil do Brasil (Centro Cultural Banco do Brasil)
2007: A história do futebol no Brasil através da charge (Sesc Ipiranga)
2008: Ziraldo – o eterno Menino Maluquinho (Salão Carioca)
2009: Angeli/Genial (Festival Internacional de Humor do Rio de Janeiro)
2010: Batman 70 Anos (Festival Internacional de Quadrinhos)
2011: Zeróis – Ziraldo na tela grande (Centro Cultural Banco do Brasil)
2012: Criando Quadrinhos – da ideia à página impressa (Festival Internacional de Quadrinhos)
2013: Ocupação Angeli (Itaú Cultural)
2014: Ícones dos Quadrinhos (Festival Internacional de Quadrinhos)
2015: Ocupação Laerte (Itaú Cultural)
2016: Exposição Beco do Rosário (Galeria Hipotética)
2017: Ocupação Glauco (Itaú Cultural)
2018: A Era Heroica – O Universo DC Comics por Ivan Reis (Victor Civita Latin American Library)
2019: Quadrinhos (São Paulo Museum of Image and Sound)
2020: Angola Janga de Marcelo D'Salette Em Angola/Moçambique

Best graphic finishing
1989: Martins Fontes
1990: Martins Fontes

Best licensing character
1998: Senninha
1999: Vida de Inseto (A Bug's Life)
2000: Pokémon

Best licensing company
1998: Character
1999: Character
2000: ITC
2001: Nintendo

Best licensing product
1998: Tazos
1999: Mamíferos Parmalat
2000: Elma Chips' Mini-cards Pokémon
2001: Guaraná Caçulinha – Pokémon

Best media about comics
This category was merged from "Best Blog About Comics", "Best Publication About Comics" and "Best Website About Comics".
2009: Blog dos Quadrinhos
2010: Universo HQ
2011: Universo HQ
2012: Mundo dos Super-Heróis

Best new project
1998: Videogibi Turma da Mônica – O Mônico

Best newspaper supplement for children
1989: O Globinho
1990: O Globinho

Best production for other medias 
This category was also called: "Best Adaptation to Another Vehicle" (1989–2010), "Best Production in Other Medias" (2011–2015) and "Best Adaptation to Another Media" (2016).
1989: Cáspite, by Sylvio Pinheiro, producer (radio program)
1993: Banana Stickers, by Angeli (sticker album)
1995: Batman – a série animada (Batman: The Animated Series), by Bruce Timm, creator (animated series)
1996: Rê Bordosa, o Ocaso de uma Doida, by Betty Erthal and Angeli, writers (theatre)
1997: O cavaleiro da tristíssima figura, by Jorge Miguel Marinho (book)
1998: HQ CD (CD-ROM)
1999: Spawn (animated series)
2000: Will Eisner – profissão cartunista, by Marisa Furtado, director (documentary)
2001: X-Men – o filme (X-Men), by Bryan Singer, director (movie)
2002: Gorillaz (music)
2003: Homem-Aranha (Spider-Man), by Sam Raimi, director (movie)
2004: X-Men 2 – o filme (X2), by Bryan Singer, director (movie)
2005: Homem-Aranha 2 (Spider-Man 2), by Sam Raimi, director (movie)
2006: Sin City – a cidade do pecado (Sin City), by Robert Rodriguez and Frank Miller, directors (movie)
2007: Wood & Stock: Sexo, Orégano e Rock'n'Roll, by Otto Guerra, director (animation)
2008: 300, by Zack Snyder, director (movie)
2009: Batman – o cavaleiro das trevas (The Dark Knight), by Christopher Nolan, director (movie)
2010: Los 3 Amigos, by Daniel Messias, director (animation short film)
2011: Malditos Cartunistas, by Daniel Garcia and Daniel Paiva (documentary)
2012: Angeli 24 Horas, by Beth Formaggini (documentary)
2013: Malditos Cartunistas, by Daniel Garcia and Daniel Paiva (TV series)
2014: Cena HQ (theatre)
2015: Cena HQ (theatre)
2016: Cena HQ (theatre)
2017: Cena HQ (theatre)
2018: Traço Livre – O Quadrinho Independente no Brasil  (documentary)
2019: Em Foco – Salão Internacional de Humor de Piracicaba (documentary)
2020: Monica and Friends: Bonds (movie)

Best publication about comics
Until 2003, this category was called "Best Magazine About Comics".
1997: Wizard (Globo)
1998: Wizard (Globo)
1999: General Visão (Acme)
2000: Herói (Conrad)
2001: Herói 2000 (Conrad)
2002: Herói.com.br (Conrad)
2003: Herói.com.br (Conrad)
2004: Wizard (Panini)
2005: Wizard (Panini)
2006: Wizard (Panini)
2007: Mundo dos Super-heróis (Europa)
2008: Mundo dos Super-heróis (Europa)

Best salon and festival
2000: 1st Festival Internacional de Humor e Quadrinhos de Pernambuco
2002: 28th Salão Internacional de Humor de Piracicaba
2003: 4th Festival Internacional de Humor e Quadrinhos de Pernambuco
2004: 30th Salão Internacional de Humor de Piracicaba
2005: 6th Festival Internacional de Humor e Quadrinhos de Pernambuco
2006: 32nd Salão Internacional de Humor de Piracicaba
2007: 33rd Salão Internacional de Humor de Piracicaba
2008: 9th Festival Internacional de Humor e Quadrinhos de Pernambuco
2009: 1st Festival Internacional de Humor do Rio de Janeiro
2010: 2nd Festival Internacional de Humor do Rio de Janeiro
2011: 3rd Salão Internacional de Humor da Amazônia
2012: 3rd Festival Internacional de Humor do Rio de Janeiro
2013: 1st Salão Internacional de Humor Gráfico de Pernambuco
2014: 1st Bienal Internacional de Caricatura

Best sticker album
1996: X-Men (Abril Panini)
1997: Mamonas Assassinas (Panini)
1998: Castelo Rá-Tim-Bum (Multi Editora)
1999: Chiquititas (Panini)
2000: Pokémon
2001: Pokémon (Panini)
2002: Harry Potter (Panini)
2003: Sítio do Pica-pau Amarelo (Panini)

Best toy
1998: Spawn
1999: Spawn
2000: Star Wars Line
2001: Rugrats

Best video game
1999: Zelda 64

Best website about comics
1999: Area-51
2000: Planet Comics
2001: Universo HQ
2002: Universo HQ
2003: Universo HQ
2004: Universo HQ
2005: Universo HQ
2006: Universo HQ
2007: Universo HQ
2008: Universo HQ

Comic book fan - personality
2013: Danilo Gentili

Featured character
1989: Batman
1990: The Joker
1991: Sandman
1992: Sandman
1993: Sandman
1994: Superman
1995: The Spirit
1996: O Menino Maluquinho
1997: Spawn
1998: Overman
1999: Níquel Náusea
2000: Piratas do Tietê
2001: Aline
2002: Ken Parker / Diomedes
2003: Spider-Man

Largest print run
1989: Mônica (Globo)
1990: Mônica (Globo)

Special awards

Great contribution
1989: Um Contrato com Deus (A Contract with God), by Will Eisner (Brasiliense)
1990: O Menino Quadradinho, by Ziraldo (Melhoramentos)
1991: Livraria Devir
1992: 1st Bienal Internacional de Quadrinhos
1993: Gibiteca Henfil
1994: 2nd Bienal Internacional de Quadrinhos
1995: I Comecom
1996: Comicmania
1997: Phenix
1998: 3rd Bienal Internacional de Quadrinhos
1999: Selecções BD
2000: Video about 30 years of O Pasquim
2001: Imago Days, artists' mailing list on the internet
2002: Paulo Caruso, for the restoration of the Ziraldo's mural in Canecão
2003: Inauguration of Museu de Artes Gráficas
2004: Exhibition A Comédia Urbana, de Honoré Daumier a Araújo Porto-Alegre
2005: Emília e a Turma do Sítio no Fome Zero (Globo)
2006: Gonçalo Jr., writer and comic book researcher
2007: Passos perdidos, história desenhada: a presença judaica em Pernambuco no Século XX, by Tânia Kaufman, Amaro Braga, Danielle Jaimes and Roberta Cirne (Arquivo Histórico Judaico de Pernambuco)
2008: Borba Gata (history drawn on the "body" of a mannequin), by Luiz Gê / Quarto Mundo, collective of independent comics / Guia do Ilustrador, by Ricardo Antunes
2009: Fnac / PNBE – Programa Nacional Biblioteca na Escola
2010: ProAc – Programa de Ação Cultural da Secretaria de Cultura do Estado de São Paulo
2011: Festa Literária Internacional de Paraty
2012: FanZines nas Zonas de Sampa
2013: História da caricatura brasileira, by Luciano Magno (Gala)
2014: Catarse
2015: ProAc – Programa de Ação Cultural (Secretaria de Cultura do Estado de São Paulo)
2016: Super-Heróis da Alegria
2017: HQ – Edição Especial (HBO) / Curso Básico de Histórias em Quadrinhos – Modalidade EAD (HQ Ceará)
2018: Creation of comic books' category in Prêmio Jabuti
2019: "Gibizão" da Turma da Mônica: Guinness World Records for biggest published comic book (Panini and MSP) / Coleção Grande Encontro Turma da Monica & Liga da Justiça (Panini, MSP and DC Comics)
2020: O Pasquim 50 Anosexhibition / National Library of Brazil's O Pasquim website

Great homage
Until 2015, this category was called "Special Homage".
1992: Editora D-Arte
1995: O Vira-Lata, by Paulo Garfunkel and Líbero Malavoglia (Paladinos de Onã)
1997: Jô Oliveira
1998: Flávio Colin / 15 years of Salão Internacional de Humor de Piracicaba
1999: 30 years of O Pasquim / 25 years of Ota in Mad
2000: Sonia Luyten
2001: Álvaro de Moya, for 50 years of the world's first comics exhibition
2002: Flávio Colin
2003: Marisa Furtado, from Scriptorium, who did the documentary Profissão Cartunista – Henfil / Ivan Consenza de Souza, Henfil's son
2004: Ziraldo, for the 50th anniversary of his career / Revista Balão, for 30 years of its release
2005: O Paulistano da Glória, by Xalberto, Bira Câmara and Sian (Via Lettera)
2007: Conceição Cahú
2008: Ivan Reis, for being named the best penciller of the year by the American edition of Wizard
2009: Fábio Moon and Gabriel Bá / Ziraldo
2010: Maria Ivete Araújo (Zetti), for her 30 years managing the Salão Internacional de Humor de Piracicaba
2011: Bar Tutti Giorni, frequented by Porto Alegre's graphic artists / Revista Ilustrar
2012: Mauro dos Prazeres / Achados e Perdidos, by Eduardo Damasceno, Luís Felipe Garrocho and Bruno Ito
2013: Ao mestre com carinho: Rodolfo Zalla, by Marcio Baraldi / Danilo Santos de Miranda / Os Zeróis, by Ziraldo (Globo)
2014: Memória Gráfica Brasileira – MGB
2015: Lilian Mitsunaga
2016: Alice Takeda (art director of Mauricio de Sousa Studios)
2017: 10 years of Guia dos Quadrinhos
2018: Douglas Quinta Reis / Sonia Luyten
2019: Aline Lemos, by the book Artistas Brasileiras / Edra, by the book Ao Mestre Com Carinho – Ziraldo 85 no traço de 85 talentosos Cartunistas
2020: Cada Passo Importa / Ivan Freitas da Costa / 20 years of Universo HQ

Great master
1990: Rodolfo Zalla
1991: Flávio Colin
1992: Carlos Zéfiro
1993: Ziraldo
1994: Eugênio Colonnese
1995: Júlio Shimamoto
1996: Cláudio Seto
1997: Walmir Amaral
1998: Miguel Penteado
1999: Mauricio de Sousa
2000: Getúlio Delfin
2001: Edmundo Rodrigues
2002: Gedeone Malagola
2003: Renato Canini
2004: Jô Oliveira
2005: Luiz Gê
2006: Ignácio Justo
2007: Sergio Macedo
2008: Ipê Nakashima / Fernando Ikoma / Paulo Fukue / Roberto Fukue / Minami Keizi
2009: Ciça / Zélio
2010: Laerte
2011: Paulo Caruso
2012: Marcatti
2013: Rubens Lucchetti
2014: Angeli
2015: Watson Portela
2016: Eva Furnari
2017: Luiz Saidenberg
2018: Daniel Azulay
2019: Carlos Edgard Herrero
2020: Miguel Paiva

International relevance
This category awards Brazilian artists who had his works published internationally. Until 2019, this category was called "International highlight".
2010: Ivan Reis
2011: Fábio Moon and Gabriel Bá
2012: Fábio Moon and Gabriel Bá
2013: André Diniz
2014: André Diniz, for Duas Luas
2015: André Diniz, for 7 Vidas
2016: Marcello Quintanilha, for Tungstênio and Talco de vidro
2017: Marcello Quintanilha
2018: Marcelo D'Salete
2019: Marcelo D'Salete, for Cumbe
2020: Sirlene Barbosa e João Pinheiro

Latin american highlight
2011: La Fiesta Pagana , by many authors (La Rosca Cómics)
2012: Revista Fierro , by many authors (Página/12)
2013: En Dosis Diarias 2 , by Alberto Montt (Ediciones B)
2014: El Viejo , by Alceo Thrasyvoulou and Matías Bergara (Loco Rabia / Dragón Comics)

Portuguese language highlight
2013: Pontas Soltas – Cidades , by Ricardo Cabral (Edições Asa)
2014: Banda Desenhada da Língua Portuguesa – BDLP /, by many authors (independent)

Publisher of the year
1989: Abril Jovem
1990: Abril Jovem
1991: Globo
1992: Record
1994: Globo / Devir
1995: Abril Jovem
1996: Abril Jovem
1997: Abril Jovem
1998: Metal Pesado
1999: Abril Jovem
2000: Via Lettera
2001: Conrad
2002: Conrad
2003: Nona Arte / Panini
2004: Conrad
2005: Devir
2006: Conrad
2007: Conrad
2008: Pixel
2009: Panini
2010: Quadrinhos na Cia
2011: Quadrinhos na Cia
2012: Leya/Barba Negra
2013: Nemo
2014: Nemo
2015: JBC / Veneta
2016: Mino
2017: SESI-SP Editora
2018: Pipoca & Nanquim
2019: Pipoca & Nanquim
2020: Pipoca & Nanquim

Valorization of comics
1989: Coleção Ver e Ler (Abril Jovem)
1990: O judaísmo para iniciantes (Le judaïsme pour débutants), by Charles Szlakmann (Brasiliense)
1993: Especial HQ (RTC)
1994: Sergio Bonelli
1995: Um Conto de Batman (Batman: Legends of the Dark Knight) (Abril Jovem)
1997: Festival Internacional de Banda Desenhada da Amadora / Comicmania
1998: Pacatatu
1999: Fábrica de Quadrinhos
2000: CLUQ
2001: São Vicente, a primeira sempre (project "500 anos de Brasil em Quadrinhos")
2002: Exhibition "História em Quadrões" (Mauricio de Sousa)
2003: As Aventuras de Nhô-Quim & Zé Caipora: os primeiros quadrinhos brasileiros 1869–1883, by Athos Eichler Cardoso, organizer (Senado Federal)
2006: 1st Salão Mackenzie de Humor (first Brazilian humor salon, in 1973 in Colégio Mackenzie)

Notes

References

Brazilian comics
Brazilian awards
Comics award winners
Comics-related lists
Lists of award winners